The Crown Prince of Jordan is the heir apparent or heir presumptive to the throne of Jordan.

The Article 28(B) of the Constitution of Jordan provides for agnatic primogeniture, meaning that the eldest son of the King automatically succeeds to the crown upon the monarch's death, unless the King has designated one of his brothers to inherit the throne as Crown Prince.

Crown Princes of Jordan (1946–present)

See also
 Succession to the Jordanian throne

Notes

References

Jordan
List
 
Crown Princes
Crown Princes
1946 establishments in Jordan